Nicholas Chamberlaine School is a coeducational secondary school and sixth form with an academy status, located in the town of Bedworth, Warwickshire, England. It has approximately 1,200 pupils between the ages of 11 and 18.

The Executive Headmistress of the school is Alison Ramsay.

Nicholas Chamberlaine VI Form is located in the Ada Lovelace building on the school campus with the current head being Rhona Bayliss. It offers BTEC and A-Level subjects.

The School is named after Nicholas Chamberlaine (1632–1715) who was a local benefactor of the small town and a prominent figure in the history of Bedworth.

History

The school officially opened in 1953 when the Headmaster was Gilbert Skinner; at this time NCS was a comprehensive school.

The school became a specialist technology college before transferring to an academy in
September 2013, when it became affiliated with the Griffin Schools Trust. The school had been classified as "failing" and placed under special measures in late 1999. but thereafter began a turnaround. In 2015 the school received a "good school" rating from Ofsted, its first such rating in 60 years.

The school was inspected again by Ofsted in 2019 and judged to Require Improvement. In 2021 it was inspected again and again judged to Require Improvement.

Previous headteachers

Gilbert Skinner - former headmaster
Bryan Addison - former headmaster
Lesley King - former principal
Jeremy Waxman - former headmaster
Nick Smallman - former headmaster
Louise Newman - former principal
Justin Creasey - former joint headmaster
Mark Bland - former joint headmaster
Paul Merrell - former headmaster and English teacher

Academic performance

In 2022, 28% of pupils achieved grade 5 or above in English and maths GCSEs. Because of the effect of the COVID-19 pandemic, the government recommends "Not making direct comparisons with data from previous years or between schools or colleges".

In 2019, the school's progress score at A Level was "well above average". The average result at the school was C-, compared to C+ in Warwickshire overall and C+ nationally.

Qualifications at NCS
GCSE:
Art, Biology, Business Studies, Citizenship, Chemistry, Computer Science, Drama, iMedia, English Language, English Literature, French, Geography, History, Mathematics, Music, Photography, Physics, Psychology, Religious Studies, Combined Science, Sociology, Health and Social Care.

A-Level:
Art, Biology, Business Studies, Chemistry, English Literature, Geography, History, Mathematics, Music, Philosophy and Ethics, Photography, Physics, Psychology, Sociology, Health and Social Care (single, double, triple), PE (single and double), Applied Science, Forensics and Criminal Investigation, Digital Media.

Notable former students

 Andy Blair (footballer)
 Pete Doherty, musician

References

External links
School website
The school's page on Warwickshire County Council website

Secondary schools in Warwickshire
Academies in Warwickshire
1953 establishments in England
Bedworth